The Laurence Olivier Award for Best Original Score or New Orchestrations is an annual award presented by the Society of London Theatre in recognition of achievements in commercial London theatre. The awards were established as the Society of West End Theatre Awards in 1976, and renamed in 1984 in honour of English actor and director Laurence Olivier.

This award was introduced in 2014, as Outstanding Achievement in Music, and was renamed to its current title in 2020.

Winners and nominees

2010s

2020s

References

External links
 

Laurence Olivier Awards